Aguada Stadium (Spanish: Estadio de Aguada) is a stadium in Aguada, Puerto Rico. It hosted some of the football events for the 2010 Central American and Caribbean Games.

References

2010 Central American and Caribbean Games venues
Aguada, Puerto Rico
Football venues in Puerto Rico